Hussein Al-Ali Hospital (HAH) is a private healthcare facility owned by the Hussein Al-Ali Medical Group, located in Al-Ahsa, in the Eastern Province of Saudi Arabia. 

It was opened on 28 February 2012, under the patronage of Saudi Prince Badr bin Muhammad bin Abdullah bin Jalawi Al Saud, the Governor of Al-Ahsa.

The hospital has tertiary-capability facilities and is JCI-Accredited since December 2016, re-accredited on 2020. 

In 2020, the Saudi CBAHI (Central Board for the Accreditation of Healthcare Institutions) has awarded the accreditation to HAH for its compliance with the established National Standards for hospitals (2019 ed.)

See also
 List of hospitals in Saudi Arabia
 Health care in Saudi Arabia
 Health in Saudi Arabia

References

External links

 Official website
 Hospital website

Hospitals in Saudi Arabia